El Budi Airport  is an airstrip serving the Teodoro Schmidt commune in the La Araucanía Region of Chile.

See also

Transport in Chile
List of airports in Chile

References

External links
OpenStreetMap - El Budi
OurAirports - El Budi
HERE Maps - El Budi
FallingRain - El Budi Airport

Airports in La Araucanía Region